Jacques Pelzer (24 June 1924 – 6 August 1994) was a Belgian musician. He played alto saxophone and flute. Notably, his performance with Chet Baker was included on Baker's quintet's Brussels 1964 album.

References

1924 births
1994 deaths
Belgian musicians
Jazz saxophonists
Belgian flautists
Belgian jazz flautists
20th-century Belgian musicians
20th-century saxophonists
Igloo Records artists
20th-century flautists